The stone heart syndrome (or Ischemic myocardial contracture) is a Global ischemic contracture of the heart, leading to a firm myocardium and loss of intracavitary volume.

The condition is rare, but the outcome typically fatal.

The stone heart syndrome was first described by Denton Cooley (1920–2016) in 1972.

stone heart syndrome was observed as a complication during Cardiopulmonary bypass surgery.

Nowadays this complication is prevented with good cardioplegia.

stone heart syndrome can also occur during Aortic valve replacement surgery.

References

Further reading
 

Cardiovascular diseases